Rahbah in Yemen may refer to:
 Rahbah of Hadramawt
 Historic district north of Sana'a, now occupied by Sana'a International Airport also known as Rahbah Airport